Malinithan is an archaeological site containing the ruins of an early medieval period temple on the northern bank of the Brahmaputra River in the Indian state of Arunachal Pradesh. It is assumed to be built by the Chutia kings in the 13th-14th century. Kechai-Khaiti, a tribal goddess found among the Bodo-kachari groups or the Buddhist goddess Tara  is considered to be the chief deity worshipped in the ruined temple. The worship of the goddess Kechaikheiti even after coming under Hindu influence was performed according to her old tribal customs. Some scholars identify Kesaikhaiti  to the Tai Khamti female deity of Nang Hoo Toungh.

Location
The Malinithan archaeological site is located at the base of the Siang mountains in the Likabali town and a sub-division of the Lower Siang district of Arunachal Pradesh.

Legend
A legend was implanted around the site in the 16th century, connecting the place to the mythological king of Bhishmaka (Lord of Vidarbha) of the epics. The association of the legend with the place led to a widespread renaming of the region.

As per the mythology constructed,  when Krishna wanted to marry Rukmini, the daughter of King Bhishmaka of Vidarbha, he abducted her prior to her wedding with Shishupala. Krishna and Rukmini then travelled from Bhishmakanagar to Dwarka, stopping at Malinithan on the way over, where they were guests of Shiva and Durga, who were doing penance. Parvati, Shiva's consort, warmly welcoming her guests, presented them with garlands made of flowers plucked from her orchard.

History
The temple does not find any mention in the 10th–11th century Kalika Purana. From all archaeological evidences at the site, archaeologists have opined that the temple belonged to the 13th century. Stone mason marks found in Malinithan were also found in other sites of Sadiya like Tamreswari temple, Bura-buri, Padum pukhuri as well as other places like Nakshaparbat and Buroi.

Features
Four sculptures of lions on two elephants were found at the four corners of the ruins of the temple.

Among the sculptures found at Malinthan, five notable ones carved out of granite stone are of Indra riding his mount Airavata, Kartikeya riding a peacock, Surya (Sun) riding a chariot, and Ganesha mounted over a mouse and a large Nandi bull. On the basis of the erotic Maithuna sculptures found here in different postures, it is believed that tantricism prevailed here as a fertility rite of the primitive tribal people who held the "mother principal as the procreative power of nature".

The temple is carved entirely out of stone, a type of temple known as Asmamayai. Iron dowels discovered in the ruins of the stone temple resembles the ones found in the Tamreswari temple of Sadiya, showing that it was probably built by the same people.

Gallery

References

Bibliography
 
 
 
 
 
 

Shiva temples
Hindu temples in Lower Siang district
Shiva temples in Arunachal Pradesh
13th-century Hindu temples
14th-century Hindu temples